Selma Delibašić (born April 14, 1980 in Sarajevo) is a Bosnian-Swedish female basketball player.

External links
Profile at eurobasket.com

1980 births
Living people
Basketball players from Sarajevo
Bosnia and Herzegovina women's basketball players
Swedish women's basketball players
Centers (basketball)
Swedish people of Bosnia and Herzegovina descent